Mei Hong (born May 1963) is a Chinese computer scientist, currently serving as Vice President of Beijing Institute of Technology, and formerly Vice President of Shanghai Jiao Tong University. He is an academician of the Chinese Academy of Sciences, a fellow of The World Academy of Sciences, an IEEE Fellow, and an ACM Fellow.

Biography 
Mei Hong was born May 1963 in Yuqing County, Guizhou, China. He earned his bachelor's degree in 1984 and his master's in 1987, both from Nanjing University of Aeronautics and Astronautics. In 1992, he obtained his Ph.D. from Shanghai Jiao Tong University.

Mei joined Peking University in 1992, and served as Dean of the School of Electronics Engineering and Computer Science from 2006 to 2014. He then became a professor and Vice President of Shanghai Jiao Tong University. In July 2016, he became Vice President of Beijing Institute of Technology.

Mei was elected an academician of the Chinese Academy of Sciences in 2011 and The World Academy of Sciences in 2013. He was elected a Fellow of the Institute of Electrical and Electronics Engineers (IEEE) in 2015 for his "contributions to software architecture and component-based software engineering". He was named to the 2022 class of ACM Fellows, "for contributions to software engineering research and translation, and establishing research standards in China".

References 

1963 births
Living people
Academic staff of Beijing Institute of Technology
Chinese computer scientists
Fellow Members of the IEEE
Fellows of the Association for Computing Machinery
Members of the Chinese Academy of Sciences
Nanjing University of Aeronautics and Astronautics alumni
People from Yuqing County
Academic staff of Peking University
Scientists from Guizhou
Shanghai Jiao Tong University alumni
Academic staff of Shanghai Jiao Tong University
TWAS fellows